Desmond P. McKane (born 1939) is an Irish retired Gaelic footballer who played for club side St. Vincent's and at inter-county level with the Dublin senior football team.

Career

McKane first came to prominence after joining the St. Vincent's club from the O'Connell's Boys' Club. He lined out during a golden era for the club and won five County Championship titles in six seasons. McKane first played for the Dublin senior team in 1960 and, after initially lining out at midfield, eventually found his best position at wing-back. He won back-to-back Leinster Championship medals in 1962 and 1963, however, the highlight of his brief inter-county career was the 1963 All-Ireland final defeat of Galway.

Honours

St. Vincent's
Dublin Senior Football Championship: 1959, 1960, 1961, 1962, 1964

Dublin
All-Ireland Senior Football Championship: 1963
Leinster Senior Football Championship: 1962, 1963

References

1939 births
Living people
St Vincents (Dublin) Gaelic footballers
Dublin inter-county Gaelic footballers